Jane Barbara Stevenson (born 12 February 1959) is a British historian, literary scholar, and author. Since 2017, she is Senior Research Fellow at Campion Hall, Oxford. From 2007 to 2017, she was Regius Professor of Humanity at the University of Aberdeen.

She was born in London and brought up in London, Beijing and Bonn. She has lectured in history at Sheffield University, and literature and history at the University of Aberdeen.

Selected works

Fiction
 
 
  (original title Astraea London: Jonathan Cape, 2001)
  (original title The Pretender London: Jonathan Cape, 2002)

References

External links
 randomhouse.co.uk
 Homepage at the University of Aberdeen

Academics from London
British women academics
Academics of the University of Sheffield
1959 births
Living people
British historians
Academics of the University of Aberdeen
British women historians